Sun4d is a computer architecture introduced by
Sun Microsystems in 1992. It is a development of the earlier Sun-4 architecture, using the XDBus system bus,
SuperSPARC processors, and SBus I/O cards. The XDBus
was the result of a collaboration between Sun
and Xerox; its name comes from an earlier Xerox
project, the Xerox Dragon. These were Sun's largest machines to date, and
their first attempt at making a mainframe-class server.

Architecture 
Sun4d computers are true SMP systems;
although memory and CPUs are installed per system board, the memory on
a given board is not in any way "closer" to the CPUs on that same
board. All memory and I/O devices are equally connected to all CPUs.

All of these computers use a passive backplane into which system
boards are plugged. Each system board provides CPUs, memory, and
an I/O bus. As system boards are added, these components are
added to the whole in a completely seamless fashion. It is not
a cluster, but works as a single large machine.

Machines 
Sun4d computers include the SPARCcenter 2000 (1992) and
SPARCserver 1000 (1993) from Sun Microsystems, and the
Cray CS6400 (1993) from Cray Research.
The system boards in these three machines are all slightly
different, physically and electronically, and are
not interchangeable.

All Sun4d machines provide JTAG ports, although unlike later systems the SPARCcenter and SPARCserver only use it for maintenance purposes.

SPARCserver 1000 

The SPARCserver 1000 is a 5U rackmountable chassis with four 40 MHz XDBus slots,
and space for four half-height 3.5" SCSI drives plus two half-height
front-accessible 5.25" SCSI drives (typically used for CD-ROM and DAT). Each
system board connects to one XDBus and provides two MBus slots
for CPUs, three SBus slots for I/O boards, four banks of memory
(four SIMMs apiece), and builtin SCSI-2, 10baseT Ethernet, and two serial ports.

Maximum configuration: eight CPUs and 2 GB RAM.

The SPARCserver 1000E has a slightly faster XDBus (50 MHz). The system boards are not backwards compatible.

The SPARCserver 1000, like earlier Sun-4/xxx servers, has a set of LEDs on each system board that display diagnostics on POST, and CPU load while running. These allow the user to see at a glance how busy each processor on the system is. They are informally referred to as "Cylon" displays, because of the way each displays a single light bouncing back and forth resembles the scanner of the robots in the original Battlestar Galactica television series.

The SPARCserver 1000 will run a slightly-patched Linux 2.4 kernel in SMP mode. 

A single octo-processor SPARCserver 1000 helped 117 SPARCstation 20 Model HS11 units, 87 with two 100 MHz hyperSPARC processors and 30 with four 100 MHz hyperSPARC processors, to render Toy Story.

SPARCcenter 2000 
The SPARCcenter 2000 is a full rack system that includes a main chassis with ten 40MHz dual-XDBus slots and several disk arrays. The system boards connect to two XDBuses for extra bandwidth, and provide two MBus slots, four SBus slots, four banks of memory (four SIMMs apiece), and two serial ports apiece. Unlike the SPARCserver 1000 boards, they do not have a builtin SCSI and Ethernet port per system board.

Maximum configuration: twenty CPUs and 5 GB RAM.

The SPARCcenter 2000E has a slightly faster XDBus (50 MHz). The system boards are not backwards compatible.

Cray Superserver 6400 

The Cray CS6400 is a 16-slot, 55 MHz quad-XDBus system. Each system board provides four MBus slots, four SBus slots, four banks of memory, and no builtin I/O ports.

Maximum configuration: sixty-four CPUs and 16 GB RAM.

When SGI purchased Cray Research in 1996, they sold the division responsible for the CS6400 to Sun, where it was developed into the extremely successful Sun Enterprise 10000.

Performance 
Relative performance of Sun-4d machines, based on SPEC 
CINT92 Rate benchmarks:

References

External links
 Xerox PARC CSL-93-17 "Papers from the SunDragon Project"
 Sun-4D Architecture, June, 1992

See also
Sun-4
SPARCstation

Sun servers